The 2013 Belarusian Premier League was the 23rd season of top-tier football in Belarus. It began in April 2013 and ended in November 2013. BATE Borisov are the defending champions, having won their 9th league title the previous year.

Format change
Starting with this season, the league will be played in two phases. The first phase will consist of a regular double-round robin tournament between 12 teams. The best six teams will qualify for the championship round, which will determine the champions and the participants for the 2014–15 European competitions. The remaining six teams play in the relegation group, where the top four teams will secure places in the 2014 competition, the fifth team (11th overall) will play a two-legged relegation play-off against the runners-up of the First League, and the sixth team (12th overall) will be automatically relegated. All points collected during the first phase will count for the second phase as well.

Teams

No teams were relegated to the First League after the 2012 season since the number of teams was shortened from 12 to 11 at the last moment in early 2012. Dnepr Mogilev, the champions of 2012 First League, were promoted to the Premier League after 1 season's absence.

Torpedo-BelAZ Zhodino, as the 11th-placed team in the 2012 Premier League, had to compete in the relegation/promotion playoffs against First League runners-up Gorodeya. Torpedo-BelAZ Zhodino won the playoff, 4–1 on aggregate, and both teams retained positions in their respective leagues.

Brest reverted their name back to Dinamo Brest a week before the start of the season.

Team summaries

First phase

League table

Results
Each team will play twice against every other team for a total of 22 matches.

Championship round

League table

Results
The best six teams of the first phase will play twice against every other team for a total of 10 matches.

Relegation group

League table

Results
The last six teams of the first phase will play twice against every other team for a total of 10 matches.

Relegation playoffs
The 11th place finisher of this competition will play a two-legged relegation play-off against the runners-up of the 2013 Belarusian First League for one spot in the 2014 Premier League.

Dnepr Mogilev won 3–1 on aggregate and remain in this division for next season.

Top goalscorers

Updated to games played on 10 November 2013 Source: football.by

See also
2013 Belarusian First League
2012–13 Belarusian Cup
2013–14 Belarusian Cup

References

External links
 Official site 

Belarusian Premier League seasons
1
Belarus
Belarus